Detlev Spangenberg (born 10 April 1944) is a German politician who represents the Alternative for Germany (AfD). He has served as a member of the Bundestag from the state of Saxony since 2017.

Biography 
Spangenberg was born in Chemnitz, Saxony. During military service in East Germany, he was a spy for the Stasi. He became member of the Bundestag after the 2017 German federal election. He is a member of the Committee on Petitions and the Committee on Health.

References

External links 

 Bundestag biography 

1944 births
Living people
Members of the Bundestag for Saxony
Members of the Bundestag 2017–2021
Members of the Bundestag for the Alternative for Germany